The World Straight Pool Championship is a pool competition, that was held up until the game of Nine-ball became popularized in America. It was the most prestigious straight pool tournament up until the 2010s, when tournaments like the American Straight Pool Championship and the European Pool Championship 14.1, that are still held annually, have gained prominence in recent years. During the tournament's early years, it was the only global professional title for straight pool (also known as 14.1 continuous). The event was revived in 2006, in part to restore the game's popularity in the United States. The World Straight Pool Championship was held in 2006, 2007, 2008, and 2010 and was sanctioned by the World Pool-Billiard Association (WPA), until ending in 2010, and with it the tournament's history of nearly 100 years. Ralph Greenleaf & Willie Mosconi are the most successful players having both won the tournament on 19 occasions. The oldest player to win the tournament is Irving Crane at 59 years old at the time of his victory. The youngest player to win the tournament is Ralph Greenleaf at 20 years old at the time of his first victory.

Format
In the modern format of the tournament, all 64 players are divided into 8 groups where they play in round-robin format. The leading 4 players in each group proceed to the next round.

The games of the last-32 round are played in double-elimination format until 16 players remain. Matches are extended to races to 150 points. 

The games in the last-16 round are played in single-elimination format, and matches are extended, to races to 200 points. The finals match is further extended to a race to 300 points (with a half-hour break occurring when a player reaches 150).

Winners

In 1910, Jerome Keough invented the game of Straight pool.

Sanctioned World Championship events

Men's champions

Top performers

 In the event of identical records, players are sorted in alphabetical order by first name.

Women's champions

Junior champions

See also

Notes

References

World championships in pool
New Brunswick, New Jersey
Sports in New Jersey
Recurring sporting events established in 2006
Annual sporting events